is a Japanese professional wrestler who works for Pro Wrestling Noah, where he is the current GHC Heavyweight Champion in his second reign.

Early life
Kiyomiya grew up a lifelong fan of professional wrestling, citing Mitsuharu Misawa as his biggest inspiration. Kiyomiya wore green trunks during his early career as tribute to Misawa.

Professional wrestling career

Pro Wrestling Noah

Early career (2015–2016)
Kiyomiya began training at the Pro Wrestling Noah dojo immediately after graduating from high school in March 2015 and made his debut on December 9, losing to Hitoshi Kumano at Winter Navigation. Kiyomiya faced Kumano again the next day, losing once again. Kiyomiya would go winless throughout the rest of 2015, losing to Taiji Ishimori, Quiet Storm, Genba Hirayanagi and Yoshinari Ogawa. He teamed with Yoshihiro Takayama at Destiny 2015 in a losing effort against Ogawa and Kumano.

Kiyomiya would remain winless until March 17, when he teamed with Mitsuhiro Kitamiya and Hitoshi Kumano to defeat Kyu Mogami, Ayato Yoshida and Go Asakawa at a Taka and Taichi Produce show for his first professional win. On that same show, Kiyomiya participated in a battle royal, which was eventually won by Takashi Iizuka. On March 27, at We Are Suzuki-Gun 2, Kiyomiya teamed with Hitoshi Kumano to defeat NJPW's Teruaki Kanemitsu and Hirai Kawato. On May 19, Kiyomiya debuted for NJPW at Lion's Gate Project 2, defeating Kawato once again, this time in a singles match. The first big win of Kiyomiya's career would come at We Are Suzuki-Gun 3 on June 18, where he outlasted eleven other wrestlers to win Minoru Suzuki's 48th Birthday Anniversary Royal Rumble Match, awarding him the right to a match against Suzuki. The two wrestled to a no-contest on July 16. Kiyomiya debuted for the Kaientai Dojo promotion on July 23, teaming with Go Asakawa in a loss to Taishi Takizawa and Kotaro Yoshino. Kiyomiya teamed with the ace of Pro Wrestling Noah, Naomichi Marufuji on August 24, defeating Minoru Suzuki and Takashi Sugiura. Kiyomiya wrestled again for NJPW on September 1 at Lion's Gate Project 3, representing Noah alongside Masa Kitamiya, Katsuhiko Nakajima, Maybach Taniguchi, and Go Shiozaki in a ten-man tag team match where they were defeated by NJPW's Hiroyoshi Tenzan, Satoshi Kojima, Yuji Nagata, Manabu Nakanishi and Katsuyori Shibata. Kiyomiya was defeated in a rematch against Minoru Suzuki on October 23. Kiyomiya entered the 2016 Global League, finishing last in his block with zero wins and zero points.

Excursion and return (2017–2018) 
On January 9, 2017, Coming of Age Day in Japan, Kiyomiya unsuccessfully faced Takashi Sugiura in a singles match, however, afterwards, Sugiura, impressed with Kiyomiya, offered him a handshake and the chance to form an alliance. Kiyomiya accepted, stating that he is ready to take the next step in his career, aligning himself with Sugiura and turning heel in the process. The following day, Kiyomiya debuted a new all black ring attire along with a more vicious ring style and ruthless attitude in a loss to Hi69. Kiyomiya, now a fully fledged heel, teamed with Sugiura on February 24 to defeat GHC Tag Team Champions Kenoh and Masa Kitamiya after Kenoh turned on Kitamiya to align himself with Sugiura and Kiyomiya. Kiyomiya teamed with Takuya Nomura in the 2017 Global Tag League. The team finished with four points after defeating Robbie E and Bram by forfeit and Cody Hall and Randy Reign on the final day of the league to prevent Hall and Reign from entering a three-way tie for first place. On May 4, Kiyomiya was pinned by Nomura, and refused a handshake following the match. On June 5, it was announced by Kiyomiya that he would be going to Canada on a learning excursion. His last match before leaving took place on June 25, where he was defeated by Kenoh.

Kiyomiya returned from his excursion on December 22, confronting and challenging Kenoh after he had defeated Eddie Edwards to win the GHC Heavyweight Championship. Afterwards, Kiyomiya was named as Kenoh's first challenger for the GHC Heavyweight Championship. Kiyomiya lost by knockout on January 6, 2018. After the match, Kenoh and Takashi Sugiura turned their back on Kiyomiya, attacking him, but he was saved by the whole NOAH roster, specifically Go Shiozaki, who helped him to the back, turning Kiyomiya face in the process. On April 11, Kiyomiya and Shiozaki defeated Kenoh and Takashi Sugiura to win the 2018 Global Tag League. A few weeks later on April 29, the two defeated The Aggression (Katsuhiko Nakajima and Masa Kitamiya) to win the GHC Tag Team Championship, but lost the titles back to them exactly one month later on May 29.

GHC Heavyweight Champion (2018–present) 
From October 30 to November 25, 2018, Kiyomiya participated in his first Global League since 2016 where he finished with a record of four wins and three losses to advance to the finals, where he was originally scheduled to face Naomichi Marufuji, however, Marufuji was forced to pull out due to injury and was replaced by runner up Katsuhiko Nakajima. Kiyomiya defeated Nakajima in the final to win the 2018 Global League. 

On December 16, Kiyomiya challenged and defeated Takashi Sugiura to win the GHC Heavyweight Championship for the first time in his career, making him the youngest ever champion in the process at the age of 22. Kiyomiya made his first defense against Kenoh, on January 6. Masa Kitamiya won a Number One Contender match against Atsushi Kotoge on January 20, but was defeated by the Heavyweight Champion on February 1. After the match, Naomichi Marufuji came to the ring and challenged Kaito Kiyomiya, and the champion accepted. The match happened on March 10, in the new ring, and Kiyomiya successfully defended his title. Kenoh appeared after the match and invited Kiyomiya to be his tag team partner to Global Tag League, and the champion accepted. Kiyomiya and Kenoh finished third in the tournament with a record of 4 wins and 3 losses, earning them 9 points. Kiyomiya successfully defended the GHC Heavyweight Championship against Takashi Sugiura on June 9. He would successfully defend his title two more times, once against Kenoh at Noah The Best 2019 in the Ryogoku Kokugikan on November 2. 

At New Sunrise on January 4, 2020, Kiyomiya would finally lose the GHC Heavyweight Championship to Go Shiozaki, ending his reign after 384 days. Kiyomiya's reign was the second-longest for a first-time title holder, second only to Kenta Kobashi's at 735 days.

Championships and accomplishments

 Pro Wrestling Illustrated
 Ranked No. 36 of the top 500 singles wrestlers in the PWI 500 in 2020
Pro Wrestling Noah
GHC Heavyweight Championship (2 times, current)
GHC Tag Team Championship (2 times) – with Go Shiozaki (1) and Masa Kitamiya (1)
Global Tag League (2018) – with Go Shiozaki
Global League (2018)
N-1 Victory (2022)
Tokyo Sports
Fighting Spirit Award (2018, 2019)

References

External links 
 
 

1996 births
Japanese wrestlers
Living people
People from Saitama (city)
GHC Heavyweight Champions
GHC Tag Team Champions